Johannes Hagge (May 4, 1893 – January 10, 1964) was a German politician of the Christian Democratic Union (CDU) and former member of the German Bundestag.

Life 
From 1946 to 1950 Hagge was a member of the state parliament in Schleswig-Holstein, where he represented the constituency of Schleswig-South. In 1948 he became District Administrator in the Schleswig district.

He was a member of the German Bundestag in its first legislative period (1949 to 1953), as a directly elected member of parliament in the constituency of Schleswig-Eckernförde. Originally elected for the CDU, he joined the FDP on 17 June 1953.

Literature

References

1893 births
1964 deaths
Members of the Bundestag for Schleswig-Holstein
Members of the Bundestag 1949–1953
Members of the Bundestag for the Christian Democratic Union of Germany
Members of the Landtag of Schleswig-Holstein